Androgyny can refer to either a combining of both sexes, or a lack of both. For plants and flowers, see Hermaphroditism in plants and Plant sexuality.

Androgyny or Androgynous may also refer to:

 "Androgynous" (song), by The Replacements
 "Androgyny" (song), a 2001 song by Garbage